Gymnoscelis oribiensis is a moth in the family Geometridae. It was described by Claude Herbulot in 1981. It is found in South Africa.

References

oribiensis
Endemic moths of South Africa
Moths described in 1981
Taxa named by Claude Herbulot